Pietro Durazzo may refer to:
Pietro Durazzo (1560–1631), Doge of Genoa
Pietro Durazzo (1632–1699), Doge of Genoa